The Legend of Lu Xiaofeng is a 2007 Chinese television series adapted from the wuxia novel series Lu Xiaofeng Series by Gu Long, starring Hong Kong actor-singer Julian Cheung as the titular protagonist. It was first broadcast on CCTV-6.

List of episodes

The 20 episodes long television series is divided into ten different stories: seven are adapted from the novels by Gu Long while the other three (marked with asterisks) are original creations by the screenwriters. Each story spans two episodes.

 Lu Xiaofeng - The Prequel (陆小凤前传)*
 The Embroidery Bandit (绣花大盗)
 Before and After the Duel (决战前后)
 The Silver Hook Gambling House (银钩赌坊)
 Phantoms' Mountain Manor (幽灵山庄)
 The Phoenix Dances in the Nine Heavens (凤舞九天)
 Laughter of the God of Sword (剑神一笑)
 Legend of the Iron Shoe (铁鞋传奇)*
 The Kingdom of the Golden Bird (大金鹏王)
 Mystery of the Blood Garment (血衣之谜)*

Cast
 Julian Cheung as Lu Xiaofeng
 Ken Chang as Hua Manlou
 Cheung Tat-ming as Sikong Zhaixing
 Peter Ho as Ximen Chuixue
 Yan Kuan as Ye Gucheng
 Fann Wong as Sha Man
 Cecilia Liu as Sun Xiuqing
 Wong Yat-fei as Tortoise Master
 Cynthia Khan as Wuyan
 Wu Yanye as Jin Jiuling
 Hugo Ng as Jiang Chongwei
 Lam Chung as Taoist Mu / Laodao Bazi
 Li Mei as Ye Xue
 Zhu Hong as Xue Bing
 Wu Jiani as Shangguan Danfeng / Shangguan Feiyan
 Bai Yan'an as Gong Susu
 Lin Han as Xia'er
 He Dandan as Ouyang Qing
 Li Qian as Niuroutang
 He Zhifeng
 Xu Jiaying
 Wu Yijiang
 Xu Shuhui
 Feng Hui
 Li Xiong

External links

Mandarin-language films
Chinese wuxia television series
2007 Chinese television series debuts
2007 Chinese television series endings
Mandarin-language television shows
China Central Television original programming
Martial arts television series
Works based on Lu Xiaofeng (novel series)
Television shows based on works by Gu Long